Poppy Starr Olsen (born 1 June 2000) is an Australian regular-footed professional skateboarder.

Skateboarding career 
Olsen became world champion in the over-14 age group in 2014 and in the over-15 age group in 2015. In 2016, she won the professional division of the Vans Combi Classic and became the first female Australian to compete in the Summer X Games.

Olsen qualified for and competed in the X Games Minneapolis 2017, taking out a bronze medal in women's park.

In July 2021, Olsen was named as part of Australia's inaugural Olympic skateboarding team to compete at the 2020 Summer Olympics in Tokyo. She competed in the women's park event. She came sixth in the Preliminary Heats and therefore competed in the final. She finished fifth. Full details are in Australia at the 2020 Summer Olympics.

References

External links 

Poppy Starr Olsen at The Boardr

The blurred lines of art and skateboarding | Poppy Starr Olsen (2014) (Video) at TEDx Talks on YouTube
Poppy Starr Olsen wins Women's Skateboard Park bronze at X Games Minneapolis 2017 (Video) at YouTube

2000 births
Living people
Australian skateboarders
Female skateboarders
LGBT skateboarders
X Games athletes
Olympic skateboarders of Australia
Skateboarders at the 2020 Summer Olympics
World Skateboarding Championship medalists